The 2014–15 CIHL season was the inaugural season of the Canadian International Hockey League (CIHL). The four teams of the CIHL played 42-game schedules.

In February 2015, the top teams of the league played down for the league championship.  Since the CIHL is independent from Hockey Canada and the Canadian Junior Hockey League, this is when the CIHL's season ended.

Changes 
League announces expansion into Espanola, Colborne, Bracebridge, St. Charles, Greater Sudbury, Batchewana, Collingwood, Barrie, Milton, and Toronto.
Bracebridge and Barrie leave the league without playing.
League joines United Hockey Union before season starts.
On Nov. 10, league leaves UHU and adds American team from Kalkaska.
Collingwood Ice, Milton Cobras, Colborne Cramahe Hawks, and Toronto Hockey Academy all elect to leave the league over insurance dispute, form World United Hockey League.
St. Charles Spirit cease operations.

Current Standings 
Note: GP = Games played; W = Wins; L = Losses; OTL = Overtime losses; SL = Shootout losses; GF = Goals for; GA = Goals against; PTS = Points; x = clinched playoff berth; y = clinched division title; z = clinched conference title

Please note: Shaded teams are no longer league members.

Teams listed on the official league website.

Standings listed on official league website.

2015 Playoffs
To be determined.

Playoff results are listed on the official league website.

Scoring leaders 
Note: GP = Games played; G = Goals; A = Assists; Pts = Points; PIM = Penalty minutes

Leading goaltenders 
Note: GP = Games played; Mins = Minutes played; W = Wins; L = Losses: OTL = Overtime losses; SL = Shootout losses; GA = Goals Allowed; SO = Shutouts; GAA = Goals against average

Awards
Top Scorer:
Most Valuable Player:
Rookie of the Year:
Top Forward:
Top Defenceman:
Top Goaltender:
Top Defensive Forward:
Most Sportsmanlike Player:
Most Heart:
Top Coach:

See also 
 2014 in ice hockey
 2015 in ice hockey

References

External links 
 Official website of the Canadian International Hockey League

CIHL